Saskia Popescu is an infectious disease epidemiologist and Senior Infection Preventionist in Phoenix, Arizona. She holds academic appointments at the University of Arizona and George Mason University’s Schar School of Policy and Government, where she lectures on biopreparedness and pandemic and outbreak response. Since the start of the Coronavirus disease 2019 pandemic, Popescu has worked to prepare for and mitigate the spread of the disease. She has been recognized for her communication efforts around the pandemic, as well as her work on the front lines.

Education 
Popescu received her Bachelor of Arts degree in classics from the University of Arizona in 2008. Her senior thesis evaluated the impact of infectious disease on the fall of the Roman Empire. She then attended the University of Arizona Mel and Enid Zuckerman College of Public Health for graduate school, receiving her Master of Public Health degree in infectious disease epidemiology 2011. Following this, she received a Master of Arts in International Security Studies in 2013 from the University of Arizona. Popescu then attended a graduate program at George Mason University to pursue her doctoral degree in biodefense. There, her research centered on global health security. Her doctoral dissertation centered on the economic and political roadblocks for the utilization of infection prevention efforts in the United States. During her graduate work, she was recognized by the Johns Hopkins Center for Health Security as an Emerging Leader in Biosecurity Initiative fellow.

Career 
Popescu's research centers on pandemic preparedness and global health security, working to prepare hospitals and advising policymakers for outbreaks of infectious diseases. She is an Assistant Professor at the Schar School of Policy and Government at George Mason University and an adjunct professor at the University of Arizona teaching biodefense. In 2015, she was involved in the response to an outbreak of measles in Maricopa County, Arizona and is currently involved in the response to Coronavirus disease 2019. In January 2020, before COVID-19 cases spiked in the United States, she warned of the consequences for cutting funding for hospitals that are equipped to respond to infectious disease outbreaks based on her research studying failures in pandemic response.

COVID-19 Pandemic 
Since the beginning of the COVID-19 pandemic in the United States, Popescu has been working to prepare hospitals for cases of COVID-19 and communicating about the disease to the public through a number of channels. Popescu has worked within Arizona hospital systems to better prepare the hospital system for a surge in COVID-19 cases and advised public health officials on mitigation approaches. She serves on several national committees to monitor and respond to COVID-19, including the National Academies of Sciences, Engineering, and Medicine's Committee on Data Needs to Monitor the Evolution of SARS-CoV-2 and the Federation of American Scientists' Coronavirus Task Force.

Popescu has also leveraged social media as a tool to communicate information about the pandemic and has been noted as a top expert to follow for reliable information. Her writing has also appeared in popular news outlets, including an Op-ed published in July in The Washington Post outlining how Arizona became a COVID-19 hotspot by not following the measures recommended by epidemiologists and public health officials. She also co-authored an editorial for The New York Times with Ezekiel Emanuel and James Phillips outlining a strategy to safely reopen schools. She and Phillips have also developed a color-coded chart to better help members of the public navigate risk around COVID-19 and make better-informed decisions about which activities to partake in. She has also spoken about the gender disparity in experts included in coverage around the pandemic, noting that men with less expertise are often cited more than women.

Awards and honors 

 Emerging Leaders in Biosecurity Fellowship, Johns Hopkins Center for Health Security, 2017

References 

Living people
American women epidemiologists
American epidemiologists
University of Arizona alumni
George Mason University alumni
George Mason University faculty
Year of birth missing (living people)